Theophile Anthony Viltz Jr. (born April 20, 1943) is a former American football cornerback in the American Football League for the Houston Oilers. He played college football at the University of Southern California.

Early years
Viltz attended Junípero Serra High School, where he practiced football and track. He accepted a football scholarship from the University of Southern California. 

He also competed in track, becoming an All-American in the high hurdles in 1964 and 1965.

Professional career

Houston Oilers
Viltz was selected by the Dallas Cowboys in the 18th round (241st overall) of the 1964 NFL Draft with a future draft pick, which allowed the team to draft him before his college eligibility was over. 

In 1966, after graduating from college, he opted to sign with the Houston Oilers of the American Football League. As a rookie, he was a backup at left cornerback and appeared in 14 games. He was waived on September 5, 1967. He was later signed to the taxi squad, where he spent the rest of the season. He was released on August 7, 1968.

Denver Broncos
In August 1968, he signed as a free agent with the Denver Broncos in the American Football League. He was activated on August 23. He was released on August 26.

Personal life
After football, he was named the defensive backs coach at Long Beach Polytechnic High School. He also competed in the category of masters athletics. His son Misana, was a record-breaking hurdler in high school.

References

1943 births
Living people
American male hurdlers
American masters athletes
American football cornerbacks
American Football League players
Houston Oilers players
USC Trojans football players
USC Trojans men's track and field athletes
High school football coaches in California
Sportspeople from Lafayette, Louisiana
Sportspeople from Los Angeles County, California
Players of American football from California
Track and field athletes from California
Junípero Serra High School (Gardena, California) alumni
People from Gardena, California